Antigua and Barbuda competed at the 2019 World Championships in Athletics in Doha, Qatar, from 27 September to 6 October 2019. Antigua and Barbuda were represented by sole athlete Cejhae Greene, who participated in the men's 100 metres event.

Results

Men 

 Track and road events

References

Nations at the 2019 World Athletics Championships
2019 in Antigua and Barbuda sport
Antigua and Barbuda at the World Championships in Athletics